Peyrot is a surname. Notable people with the surname include:

 Arturo Peyrot (1908–1993), Italian artist
 Lara Peyrot (born 1975), Italian cross-country skier
  (born 1972), Italian archery biathlete

See also
 Peiròt